The A4 in Cyprus is a road which links the centre of Larnaca with the original terminal of Larnaca International Airport. Although it has an A designation, it is not a motorway, and contains all at grade separation junctions and a number of traffic lights. It follows the route of Artmedios Avenue.

See also 
 A1 motorway (Cyprus)
 A2 motorway (Cyprus)
 A3 motorway (Cyprus)
 A6 motorway (Cyprus)
 A7 motorway (Cyprus)
 A9 motorway (Cyprus)
 A22 motorway (Cyprus)

References 

Motorways and roads in Cyprus